Barbayianakis or Μια μαύρη πέτρα του γιαλού (Mia mavri petra tou gialou)(el) and Μπαρμπαγιαννακάκης(el) is an anonymous Greek folkloric tune (Syrtos or Tsifteteli). The meter is .There are similar folkloric tunes such as the Cyprus tune "Loulla mou maroula mou"(Λουλλα μου μαρουλα μου).

Original form

The original form of the Syrtos  was popular in Urla.

References

Greek songs
Turkish songs
Haris Alexiou songs
Year of song unknown
Songwriter unknown